Hans-Joachim Fassnacht (born 28 November 1950) is a retired German swimmer. He competed at the 1968 and  1972 Summer Olympics in various freestyle and butterfly events and won a silver medal in the 4 × 200 m freestyle in 1972. In 1972 he also won a 1500 m freestyle semifinal, setting an Olympic record, but withdrew from the final.

During his career, Fassnacht set 41 German, 21 European and 2 world records, as well as five world best times. In 1969, while attending Long Beach State University, he broke the world record in the 400 m freestyle, and next year he broke another one, in the 200 m butterfly. He was selected as West German Sportspersonality of the Year three times in a row: in 1969, 1970 and 1971, beating Franz Beckenbauer. In 1992 he was inducted into the International Swimming Hall of Fame.

See also
 List of members of the International Swimming Hall of Fame
World record progression 400 metres freestyle

References

External links

1950 births
Living people
Sportspeople from Stuttgart (region)
German male swimmers
Olympic swimmers of West Germany
Olympic silver medalists for West Germany
Swimmers at the 1968 Summer Olympics
Swimmers at the 1972 Summer Olympics
World record setters in swimming
German male freestyle swimmers
European Aquatics Championships medalists in swimming
Medalists at the 1972 Summer Olympics
Olympic silver medalists in swimming
20th-century German people
21st-century German people
People from Heilbronn (district)
Long Beach State Beach swimmers